1976 in Korea may refer to:
1976 in North Korea
1976 in South Korea